Antonio Bachiller y Morales (1812–1889) was a Cuban lawyer, historian and bibliographer, the "father of Cuban bibliography".

Life
Antonio Bachiller y Morales was born to a wealthy family in Havana.

Works
 Apuntes para la historia de las letras y instrucción publica de la isla de Cuba [Notes for a History of Letters and Public Education in Cuba], 3 vols, 1859–1860
 Cuba primitiva, 1880
 Cuba: Monografía histórica ... desde la perdida de la Habana hasta la restauración española, 1883

References

1812 births
1889 deaths
19th-century Cuban lawyers
19th-century Cuban historians
Archaeology of Cuba
Bibliographers